The Copa de Honor Adrián Beccar Varela (or simply Copa Adrián Beccar Varela) was an Argentine official football competition organized by dissident "Liga Argentina de Football", the first league that organised professional competition in Argentina. The trophy was named after Adrián Beccar Varela, president of both bodies, dissident "Asociación Amateurs de Football" (1920) and the official association (1927–28).

Overview 

The first edition was contested by 18 Primera División teams. The format of the tournament was a group stage where teams competed within 3 groups of 6 teams each. Each group played a round-robin tournament, in which each team was scheduled for three matches against other teams in the same group. The team finishing first of each group advanced to the next stage where they played each other, and the team with more points at the end of the round was proclaimed champion.

For the second edition played in 1933, four Uruguayan clubs (Peñarol, Nacional, Defensor and Sud América) took part of the competition, although the Association considered it as a national cup.

Champions

Notes

Topscorers 
Source:

Other trophies
Otherwise, there was another trophy also named "Copa Adrián Beccar Varela" but organized by the official association and played by teams of regional leagues. The first edition was held in 1929 and won by a combined from Liga Rosarina de Football.

References

B